Zigao may refer to:

People named Zigao (子高)

Shang dynasty
 Xiao Jia (小甲) (. 1666–1650 BCE), personal name Zi Gao (子高), the seventh King of the Shang dynasty.

Spring and Autumn period
  (国子高), an official of the Qi state in the Spring and Autumn period (771–476 BCE).
 Duke of Ye (叶公) (529–after 479 BCE), courtesy name Zigao (子高), also known as Shen Zhuliang (沈諸梁), general of the Chu state.
  (公子祁), courtesy name Zigao (子高), son of Duke Hui of Jiang Qi (. 608–559 BCE).

Warring States period
  (公子高) ( 334, 323 BCE), son of King Hui of Wei.
  (孔穿), courtesy name Zigao (子高), a descendant of Confucius in the Warring States period, possibly a contemporary of Gongsun Long (325–250 BCE).

Qin dynasty
  (公子高) (. 209 BCE), a son of Qin Shi Huang.

Han dynasty
  (冯商), courtesy name Zigao (子高), a historian during the reign of Emperor Cheng of Han (. 51–7 BCE).
 Zhang Chang (張敞) (. 48 BCE), courtesy name Zigao (子高), Han scholar and official.
  (唐林), courtesy name Zigao (子高), an official during the reign of Emperor Ai of Han (. 27–1 BCE).
  (劉弘) ( 189), courtesy name Zigao (子高), an official of the Eastern Han, appointed as Minister of Works (司空).
  (董重) (. 189), courtesy name Zigao (子高), nephew of Empress Dowager Dong, mother of Emperor Ling of Han.

Three Kingdoms period
 Sun Deng (孫登) (209–241), courtesy name Zigao (子高), the Eastern Wu crown prince.

Jin dynasty
 Su Jun (蘇峻) (. 328), courtesy name Zigao (子高), a general of the Eastern Jin dynasty.

Southern and Northern dynasties
 Xing Kang (邢亢), courtesy name Zigao (子高), son of the Northern Wei official,  (478–528).
 Han Zigao (韩子高) (538–567), a general of the Chen dynasty.
  (王操), courtesy name Zigao (子高), a prime minister during the reign of Emperor Ming of Western Liang (. 542–585).

Tang dynasty
 Zheng Zigao (郑子高), father of the Tang official,  (738–796).

Song dynasty
 Jia Qiao (郟僑), courtesy name Zigao (子高), son of the Song official,  (1038–1103).
  (陳克) (1081–1137), courtesy name Zigao (子高), an official during the reign of Emperor Gaozong of Song.
  (方山京), courtesy name Zigao (子高), zhuangyuan (1st ranked Jinshi 進士) in 1262 during the reign of Emperor Lizong of Song.

Ming dynasty
  (劉崧) (1321–1381), courtesy name Zigao (子高), an official during the reign of Hongwu Emperor.
  (陸子高) (1354–1431), a Ming imperial scholar (Gongshi 貢士) during the reign of Hongwu Emperor.
  (马京) (. 1411), courtesy name Zigao (子高), a Ming imperial scholar (Jinshi) in 1385.
  (鄭岑) (. 1420), courtesy name Zigao (子高), a Ming imperial scholar (Jinshi) in 1454.
 Guo Zigao (郭子高), grandfather of a Ming imperial scholar (Jinshi) in 1475,  (1448–1513), and great-grandfather of another in 1517, .
  (孙升) (1501–1560), courtesy name Zigao (子高) or Zhigao (志高), a Ming imperial scholar (Jinshi) in 1535.
  (李侨) ( 1544), courtesy name Zigao (子高), a Ming imperial scholar (Jinshi) in 1544.
  (潘一桂) ( 1559), courtesy name Zigao (子高), a Ming imperial scholar (Jinshi) in 1559.

Qing dynasty
  (戴望) (1837–1873), courtesy name Zigao (子高), a scholar during the reign of Xianfeng Emperor.

Modern China
  (张子高) (1886–1976), a Hubei-born scientist, professor in Tsinghua University.
 Shen Zigao (沈子高) (1895–1982), an Anglican bishop in Shanxi, China.
  (丁子高) (. 1979), a Hong Kong actor.

People named Zigao (子羔)
 Gao Chai (高柴) (6–5 cc. BCE), courtesy name Zigao (子羔), a disciple of Confucius.
Eponymous excavated text from the Shanghai Museum collection.
  (姜子羔), a Ming politician and imperial scholar (Jinshi) in 1553, grandson of another imperial scholar in 1502, .

People named Zigao (諮皋)
 Yu Zigao (俞諮皋) (. 1628), an admiral and contemporary of Zheng Zhilong.